Between Two Worlds is the third studio album by Christian rapper, Trip Lee. The album was released on Reach Records on June 22, 2010.

Reception
It is the first Christian rap album ever to go No. 1 on the Christian album chart beating out The Generous Mr. Lovewell by MercyMe. The album went on to be nominated for two Dove Awards and to win the Stellar Award for Best Hip Hop Album in 2011.

Track listing

Awards

The album was nominated for a Dove Award for Rap/Hip-Hop Album of the Year at the 42nd GMA Dove Awards.

Release history

References

2010 albums
Trip Lee albums
Reach Records albums
Albums produced by Gawvi
Albums produced by DJ Official